Walkerville is a town in Silver Bow County, Montana, United States, that is an enclave of the consolidated city-county of Butte. The population was 639 at the 2020 census. Walkerville is a suburb of Butte, and the only other incorporated community in the county, as well as the only part of the county that is not part of Butte.

Part of Walkerville is included in the Butte-Anaconda Historic District. Walkerville represents some of the earliest mines in the district and preserves the early mining camp flavor present in the 1890s to 1910s.

History
Walkerville is a suburb of Butte, Montana and is home to some of the earliest mining sites in the area. These sites attracted many investors to Walkerville in the late 1800s. Walkerville is named for four of those investors: brothers Joseph, Samuel, Matthew and David Walker of Salt Lake City; they had purchased the lucrative Alice mine upon recommendation by their agent (and later Copper King) Marcus Daly.

There were many different types of materials mined depending on the location of a given site. Copper and silver were two of the most commonly mined materials. In 1893, silver prices dropped, but the town's economy continued to thrive due to its copper production. Walkerville's economic success continued until 1918 when the end of World War I caused copper prices to drop as well. In 2015, nearly all of the town's many mines are abandoned. Some of these sites have become very dangerous and plans are being made to restore or remove them.

Geography
Walkerville is located at  (46.029963, -112.538348).

Neighborhoods
 Corktown
 Sun View Terrace 
 Seldom Seen 
 Dewey's Point 
 Chicken Flat 
 Butchertown 
 the Corra 

Butchertown was named for Rollo Butcher, Walkerville's first permanent resident.

Demographics

2010 census
As of the census of 2010, there were 675 people, 304 households, and 175 families residing in the town. The racial makeup of the town was 93.2% White, 0.1% African American, 3.3% Native American, 0.6% Asian, 0.3% Pacific Islander, 0.3% from other races, and 2.2% from two or more races. Hispanic or Latino of any race were 3.9% of the population.

There were 304 households, of which 27.6% had children under the age of 18 living with them, 41.4% were married couples living together, 10.2% had a female householder with no husband present, 5.9% had a male householder with no wife present, and 42.4% were non-families. 35.2% of all households were made up of individuals, and 13.2% had someone living alone who was 65 years of age or older. The average household size was 2.22 and the average family size was 2.90.

The median age in the town was 44.2 years. 22.4% of residents were under the age of 18; 8.6% were between the ages of 18 and 24; 20.3% were from 25 to 44; 33.8% were from 45 to 64; and 15% were 65 years of age or older. The gender makeup of the town was 48.6% male and 51.4% female.

2000 census
As of the census of 2000, there were 714 people, 297 households, and 195 families residing in the town. The population density was 325.1 people per square mile (125.3/km2). There were 343 housing units at an average density of 156.2 per square mile (60.2/km2). The racial makeup of the town was 94.26% White, 0.14% African American, 4.06% Native American, 0.28% Asian, 0.70% from other races, and 0.56% from two or more races. Hispanic or Latino of any race were 3.22% of the population.

There were 297 households, out of which 31.3% had children under the age of 18 living with them, 49.5% were married couples living together, 11.1% had a female householder with no husband present, and 34.3% were non-families. 30.6% of all households were made up of individuals, and 11.4% had someone living alone who was 65 years of age or older. The average household size was 2.40 and the average family size was 3.00.

In the town, the population was spread out, with 25.5% under the age of 18, 8.7% from 18 to 24, 27.3% from 25 to 44, 25.5% from 45 to 64, and 13.0% who were 65 years of age or older. The median age was 37 years. For every 100 females there were 97.8 males. For every 100 females age 18 and over, there were 102.3 males.

The median income for a household in the town was $28,009, and the median income for a family was $29,861. Males had a median income of $27,404 versus $19,063 for females. The per capita income for the town was $14,156. About 9.9% of families and 12.1% of the population were below the poverty line, including 18.8% of those under age 18 and 5.0% of those age 65 or over.

See also

 List of municipalities in Montana

References

External links

 Butte History and "Lost Butte": Walkerville, 1881

Towns in Silver Bow County, Montana